Datana ranaeceps, the post-burn datana, is a species of moth in the family Notodontidae (the prominents). Other common names include the heart-leaved catchfly and ranaeceps datana moth. It was first described by Félix Édouard Guérin-Méneville in 1844 and it is found in North America.

The MONA or Hodges number for Datana ranaeceps is 7911.

References

Further reading

 
 
 

Notodontidae
Articles created by Qbugbot
Moths described in 1844